Dmitrovsky District is an administrative and municipal district (raion), one of the thirty-six in Moscow Oblast, Russia. It is located in the north of the oblast and borders with Tver Oblast in the northwest, Klinsky District in the west, Solnechnogorsky District in the southwest, Taldomsky District in the north, Sergiyevo-Posadsky District in the east, Pushkinsky District in the southeast, and with Mytishchinsky District in the south. Its administrative center is the town of Dmitrov. Population:  149,793 (2002 Census);  The population of Dmitrov accounts for 40.5% of the district's total population.

Geography
The district is hilly in the south, while the northern portion is mostly flat.

The major river flowing through the district include the Sestra, the Volgusha, the  Dubna river and the Yakot. Moscow Canal which connects the Moskva River with the Volga River runs through the district.

History

2013 psychiatric hospital fire
On the morning of April 26, 2013, a fire swept through Psychiatric Hospital #14 in the settlement of Ramensky, killing thirty-eight people.

References

Notes

Sources

Districts of Moscow Oblast
 
